Microseminoprotein, prostate associated is a protein that in humans is encoded by the MSMP gene.

Function

This gene encodes a member of the beta-microseminoprotein family. Members of this protein family contain ten conserved cysteine residues that form intra-molecular disulfide bonds. The encoded protein may play a role in prostate cancer tumorigenesis.

References

Further reading 

Human proteins